The 1997–98 Primera División de México (Mexican First Division) was the 56th professional season of Mexico's top-flight football league. The season began on Friday, July 25, 1997, and ended on April 6, 1998.

UANL was promoted to the Mexico Primera División as Pachuca was relegated to the Primera División A.

Overview

Teams

Torneo Invierno

"Invierno 1997" began on Friday, July 25, 1997, and ran until October 26 not including the playoffs. In the final Cruz Azul defeated León and became champions for the 8th time.

Final standings (groups)

Group 1

Group 2

Group 3

Group 4

League table

Results

Top goalscorers 
Players sorted first by goals scored, then by last name. Only regular season goals listed.

Source: Liga MX

Playoffs

Bracket

Quarterfinals

León won 6–4 on aggregate.

América won 4–1 on aggregate.

Cruz Azul won 5–1 on aggregate.

Atlante won 1–0 on aggregate.

Semifinals

Cruz Azul won 2–1 on aggregate.

León won 3–2 on aggregate.

Finals
First leg

Second leg

Cruz Azul won 2–1 on aggregate.

Torneo Verano

"Verano 1998" began on Saturday, January 3, 1998, and ran until April 6. In the final Toluca defeated Necaxa and became champions for the fourth time on May 10.

Final standings (groups)

Group 1

Group 2

Group 3

Group 4

League table

Results

Top goalscorers 
Players sorted first by goals scored, then by last name. Only regular season goals listed.

Source: MedioTiempo

Playoffs

Repechage

UAG won 5–3 on aggregate.

América won 6–3 on aggregate.

Bracket

Quarterfinals

Toluca won 6–1 on aggregate.

América won 3–2 on aggregate.

Necaxa won 2–1 on aggregate.

Atlas won 5–4 on aggregate.

Semifinals

Toluca won 3–1 on aggregate.

Necaxa won 3–2 on aggregate.

Finals
First leg

Second leg

Toluca won 6–4 on aggregate.

Relegation table

External links
 Mediotiempo.com (where information was obtained)

1998 Verano
1
Mex